, also known as pulling-in counter, is one of the preserved throwing techniques, Habukareta Waza, of judo. It belonged to the fourth group, Yonkyo, of the 1895 Gokyo no Waza lists. It is categorized as a front sacrifice technique, Ma-sutemi.

Description 
This technique is similar to Sumi Gaeshi, except that tori traps one of uke's arms.

Similar techniques, variants, and aliases 
English aliases:

Similar techniques:

 Sumi gaeshi
 tomoe nage

See also
The Canon Of Judo
 Kodokan
 Judo
 List of Kodokan Judo techniques
 Judo technique
 Sumi Gaeshi
 Hikikomori

References

External links
 Web page with illustration of Hikikomi Gaeshi

Judo technique
Throw (grappling)
Grappling hold
Grappling positions
Martial art techniques